Olwen Fouéré (born March 2, 1954) is an Irish actress and writer/director in theatre, film and visual arts. She was born in Galway, Ireland to Breton parents Yann Fouéré and Marie-Magdeleine Mauger. In 2020, she was listed at number 22 on The Irish Times list of Ireland's greatest film actors.

Theatre 
As a freelance actress, Fouéré works internationally in English and French with numerous appearances at the Abbey Theatre, the Gate Theatre in Ireland, the Royal National Theatre in England, the Bouffes du Nord in Paris, at Brooklyn Academy of Music New York, Sydney Theatre Company Australia and Shakespeare Theatre Company, DC. In 1980 she formed Operating Theatre, an avant-garde theatre company with composer Roger Doyle. She later established an artistic entity called TheEmergencyRoom for the development of her ongoing projects which have included the creation of her internationally acclaimed RIVERRUN (her adaptation of the voice of the river in James Joyce's Finnegans Wake); her staging of Lessness by Samuel Beckett (Barbican, Galway International Arts Festival and Project Arts Centre, Dublin); her translation and production of Danse, Morob, written for her by the French writer Laurent Gaudé and her translation and performances of Sodome, My Love (in association with Rough Magic) also by Laurent Gaudé; a film project co-directed by Kevin Abosch from a script by Anne Enright titled Cassandra:fragments of a playscript.

Filmography

Film 
 This Must Be the Place (2011) directed by Paolo Sorrentino. Role: Mary's mother
 The Other Side of Sleep (2012) directed by Rebecca Daly. Role: Maggie
 The Survivalist (2015) directed by Stephen Fingleton. Role: Kathryn
 Mandy (2018) directed by Panos Cosmatos. Role: Mother Marlene
 Fantastic Beasts: The Crimes of Grindelwald (2018) directed by David Yates. Role: Melusine
 Beast (2018) directed by Michael Pearce. Role: Det. Theresa Kelly
 Animals (2019) directed by Sophie Hyde. Role: Maureen
 Zone 414 (2020) directed by Andrew Baird. Role: Royale
She Will (2021) directed by Charlotte Colbert. Role: Jean
 Texas Chainsaw Massacre (2022) directed by David Blue Garcia. Role: Sally Hardesty
 The Northman (2022) directed by Robert Eggers. Role: Ashildur Hofgythja
 The Actor (TBA) directed by Duke Johnson. Role: Old Lady Track.

Television 
 Above Suspicion (Mrs Hughes) /Gillies MacKinnon/ ITV/ by Lynda LaPlante
 The Ambassador /Ken Grieve/ Ecosse Film and TV
 Ballykissangel series one /Chris Harrison / BBC
 Hard Shoulder /MirrorFilms/RTÉ/Channel 4/ by Mark Kilroy
 When Reason Sleeps (Celia)/ R. Wynne Simmons /RTÉ/ Channel 4
 Time After Time (Young Nun) /Bill Hays/ BBC
 The Irish R.M. (Miss Malone) /Roy Ward-Baker / BBC/RTÉ
 A Painful Case (Mary Sinico) / John Lynch /RTÉ/ Channel 4
 The Babysitters /Pat O'Connor / RTÉ
 Nightflyers /Connie / SYFY
 Cursed /Yeva / Netflix
 The Crown /Oonagh Shanley-Toffolo / Netflix

Visual arts 
Olwen Fouéré features in several works by artist James Coleman which continue to be shown internationally. Their first collaboration So Different and Yet... was created in 1980. She worked with artist Andrew Duggan on "unravel_róis" on Inis Oirr, Dublin Biennial and University of Lyon. She collaborated with artist Jesse Presley Jones representing Ireland at the Venice Biennale 2017 on a film installation 'Tremble Tremble'.

Honours 
Olwen Fouéré was conferred with an Honorary Doctorate (Doctor of Philosophy - Honoris Causa) from Dublin City University in April 2016

Awards 
 The Irish Times Theatre Awards Special Tribute 2013 for outstanding achievement and contribution to theatre in Ireland. 
 The Herald Archangel Award 2014 for "riverrun" and her outstanding contribution to the Edinburgh Festivals. 
 'Best Actress' in the Irish Times/ESB theatre awards 2011 for "Sodome, My Love" by Laurent Gaudé produced by Rough Magic in association with TheEmergencyRoom
 'Samuel Beckett Award' at the Dublin Theatre Festival for her role as Hester Swane in the world premiere of "By the Bog of Cats" by Marina Carr at the Abbey Theatre 1998.
 'Best Actress' at the Dublin Theatre Festival 1982

Nominations 
 IFTA nomination for 'Best Supporting Actress' in 'The Survivalist' by Stephen Fingleton 
 'Best Actress' in the Irish Times Theatre Awards 2013 for 'riverrun' by TheEmergencyRoom 
 'Best Actress' in the Harvey Awards 1985 for 'The Diamond Body' by Operating Theatre.
 'Best Actress' in the Irish Times/ESB Theatre awards 1999 for 'By the Bog of Cats' by Marina Carr
 'Best Actress' in the Irish Times/ESB Theatre awards 2000 for 'Angel/Babel' by Operating Theatre 
 'Best Actress' in the Irish Times Theatre Awards 2006 for 'Titus Andronicus' directed by Selina Cartmell.

Publications 
She has contributed to a number of publications on contemporary theatre and performance including:
 The Dreaming Body, edited by Melissa Sihra and Paul Murphy;
 Women in Irish Drama, edited by Melissa Sihra 
 Actors Voices: the people behind the performances, edited by Patrcik O'Kane 
 The Theatre of Marina Carr, edited by Cathy Leeney and Anna McMullan 
 Theatre Talk, edited by Lilian Chambers, Ger Fitzgibbon and Eamonn Jordan 
 Operating Theatre 1980–2008

Documentary 
A documentary of a year in her life, "Theatre in the Flesh" directed by Dara McCluskey, was produced for RTÉ's Arts Lives series in 2005.

External links 
 Olwen Fouére Official website

References

Living people
Irish stage actresses
Irish film actresses
21st-century Irish writers
Irish people of Breton descent
Place of birth missing (living people)
1953 births